"Waving Through a Window" is the second song from Act 1 of the 2015 musical Dear Evan Hansen, which premiered on Broadway in 2016. Benj Pasek and Justin Paul wrote both the music and lyrics.

Synopsis

Lyrical analysis
The final chorus is based on the metaphor “If a tree crashes in the forest and no one is there to hear it, did it make a sound?”, however Steven Levenson, the musical's librettist, came up with the idea of Evan "literally falling in a forest," resulting in the final lyric.

Reception
In his review of the Broadway production of the musical for The New York Times, Charles Isherwood praised Ben Platt's performance, writing "...when Mr. Platt sings Evan's songs — including the touching introductory cri de coeur, "Waving Through a Window" — we can simultaneously hear the heartsore, conflicted young man and the intelligent, kindly kid buried inside him." On July 23, 2020, "Waving Through a Window" was named the "Most Listened To Song From Musicals In The Car" from a study by Halfords analyzing the top "road trip" songs from multiple genres through Spotify playlists. In 2020, Sportsshoes.com named "Waving Through a Window" the 2nd-most popular show tune people went running to.

Charts

Certifications

2021 film version

"Waving Through a Window" was featured in Universal Pictures' 2021 film adaptation of the musical, starring Ben Platt, who reprised his performance in the titular role. The film, which premiered at the 2021 Toronto International Film Festival on September 9, 2021, followed by a theatrical release on September 24, 2021, is directed by Stephen Chbosky from a screenplay by Levenson, who also serves as an executive producer with Michael Bederman, Pasek & Paul, and the show's lead producer Stacey Mindich. Ben's father Marc Platt and Adam Siegel serve as producers.

In the film, the song is moved to the first scene in Evan's bedroom following his opening monologue and plays through his journey to the high school and his being unable to connect with the other students when in the halls, ending in the school's gymnasium. This was a result from the cutting of "Anybody Have a Map?", the opening number of the stage musical. This creative decision was negatively received by critics and audiences, largely due to the filmmakers' main goal to capture and immortalize Ben Platt's performance. Chbosky explained the reason for this, saying that "...we felt the best way to tell the story was to start with Evan, start with "Waving Through a Window." And then, when you meet Connor's parents, they're strangers to us. We're really on Evan's journey. It freed us up to meet all the characters through Evan. And it binds the audience to a way in Evan that is so valuable."

This version of the song was made available as an exclusive download from the soundtrack album on August 26, 2021, alongside "You Will Be Found." The album was released on September 24, 2021, the same day as the film. Platt also performed the song on The Tonight Show Starring Jimmy Fallon on September 15, 2021 to promote the film.

On March 4, 2022, a clip of the climax of this film's version of the song was uploaded to Twitter as a parody response to a viral clip of the opening long take shot of "The Dance at the Gym" sequence from Steven Spielberg's 2021 film version of West Side Story, that was uploaded the weekend before. Like that clip, it went viral, reaching over a million views and over 15,000 likes, leading many users to compare the visual styles and production values of the two films.

References

2010s ballads
2015 songs
2017 singles
2018 singles
2019 singles
2021 singles
Ben Platt songs
Katy Perry songs
Tori Kelly songs
Owl City songs
Pentatonix songs
Songs from musicals
Songs written by Benj Pasek
Songs written by Justin Paul (songwriter)
Songs from Pasek and Paul musicals
Songs from Dear Evan Hansen
Songs about mental health
Songs about depression
Songs about loneliness
Interscope Records singles